Giovanni Ghisolfi (1623 – 7 June 1683) was an Italian painter of the Baroque period.

Biography
Born in Milan, he initially trained with his uncle, Antonio Volpino. At the age of 17, he traveled to Rome with his friend Antonio Busca where he painted veduta and capricci, mainly landscapes with architectural fragments and ruins. They would garner renewed interest with the rise of Neoclassicism in the mid-late 18th century.

In 1661, he decorated a chapel of the Certosa di Pavia. In 1664 he was called to Vicenza to execute a series of decorative landscape frescoes in the Palazzo Trissino Baston and the Palazzo Giustiniani Baggio. He painted also in Palazzo Borromeo Arese at Cesano, Reatis' Palace in Lissone and in the fourth chapel of the Sacri Monti and covered the vaults of the Basilica of San Vittore in Varese.

Among his pupils was his nephew, Bernardo Racchetti from Milan (1639–1702).

References

Artnet Grove Encyclopedia entry

1623 births
1683 deaths
17th-century Italian painters
Italian male painters
Italian vedutisti
Painters from Milan
Italian Baroque painters
Painters of ruins